Goderdzi Natroshvili (born 20 May 1970) is a retired footballer who played as a midfielder for clubs in the Soviet Union, Cyprus and Greece.

Playing career
Natroshvili began playing football in the Soviet lower leagues, and moved on to Georgian league clubs. He spent two seasons playing in the Cypriot league before returning to Georgia to play for FC Torpedo Kutaisi.

In July 1999, Natroshvili joined Greek second division side Panachaiki F.C. He helped the club gain promotion to the Greek Superleague and would play the following two seasons in the top flight with Panachaiki. He participated less frequently in his last season with the club, making just nine league appearances, and moved to the Greek second division with Kalamata F.C. the following season.

Managerial career
Following his playing career, Natroshvili became a football manager. He led Greek club PAS Giannina F.C. during 2004.

References

External links
Profile at legioner.kulichki.com
ΞΕΝΟΙ ΠΑΙΚΤΕΣ ΚΑΙ ΠΡΟΠΟΝΗΤΕΣ ΤΗΣ ΠΑΝΑΧΑΪΚΗΣ

1970 births
Living people
Footballers from Georgia (country)
Anagennisi Deryneia FC players
APEP FC players
Panachaiki F.C. players
Kalamata F.C. players
Cypriot First Division players
Expatriate footballers from Georgia (country)
Expatriate footballers in Cyprus
Expatriate footballers in Greece
PAS Giannina F.C. managers
Association football midfielders
Football managers from Georgia (country)